John Batdorf (born March 26, 1952) is an American singer and songwriter from Yellow Springs, Ohio. He is the son of Jack and Nancy Batdorf, and nephew of Earl Batdorf, aka Earl Scott, a Country singer who charted several hits during the mid-1960s.

On 14 August 1976 edition of American Top 40, Casey Kasem reported that although Batdorf came from a musical family, he had originally aspired to play professional baseball.  However, these dreams were crushed following his being stricken with osteomyelitis (OM), an infection of the bones, at age 11.  It was necessary for him to be in a full-body cast for a year, and he was told that he would never be able to play competitive sports again.  Out of boredom he picked up a guitar and began to learn, and then the piano, giving him a new set of musical aspirations.

Batdorf's musical career began in 1967 after moving to Los Angeles.  He joined with Mark Rodney in 1971 to form the duo Batdorf & Rodney.  Their biggest hit was "Somewhere in the Night" (U.S. #69, 1975).

Following their breakup in 1975, he formed the group Silver, with whom he had his biggest hit, "Wham Bam" (U.S. #16, 1976).  He sings lead on the song, which was their only hit.  "Wham Bam" was revived by appearing in 2017’s blockbuster movie, Guardians of the Galaxy Vol. 2, and had nearly 8 million plays on YouTube.

Batdorf has also enjoyed success as a film and TV composer with credits from Touched by an Angel, Promised Land, Book Of Days and The Best Two Years, session vocalist on several hit records and commercials, and songwriter for Kim Carnes, England Dan and America.

In 1997 he formed Batdorf & McLean with Michael McLean, with whom he had collaborated earlier as arranger and vocalist, and they released an album, Don't You Know. In 2012, the two teamed up to make Soundtrax2Recovery.

In 2006, he released the solo album Home Again, reuniting him with Mark Rodney on some of the tracks.  The album features many Batdorf & McLean compositions. Since that release John has released, Old Man Dreamin’, One Last Wish, Beep Beep, Next Stop Willoughby, Me And My Guitar, Last Summer, An Extraordinary Ordinary Life and his latest 2022 release, Side II.

References

External links
 

1952 births
Living people